The 1972 County Championship was the 73rd officially organised running of the County Championship, and ran from 3 May to 12 September 1972. Warwickshire County Cricket Club claimed their third title.

Table

 Pld = Played, W = Wins, L = Losses, D = Draws, D1 = Draws in matches reduced to single innings, A = Abandonments, BatBP = Batting points, BowBP = Bowling points, Pts = Points.
10 points for a win
5 points to each side for a tie
5 points to side still batting in a match in which scores finish level
Bonus points awarded in first 85 overs of first innings
Batting: 1 point for each 25 runs above 150
Bowling: 2 point for every 2 wickets taken
No bonus points awarded in a match starting with less than 8 hours' play remaining.
Position determined by points gained. If equal, then decided on most wins.
Each team plays 20 matches.

Results

Records

Batting

References

1972 in English cricket
County Championship seasons
County